Persidafon Dafonsoro or Persidafon Jayapura or Persidafon is an Indonesian football club based in Jayapura, Papua. The club was founded in 1970. The traditional team home kit is black and white striped shirt, resembling the Udinese Calcio shirt. They currently compete in the Liga 3 and their home stadium is Barnabas Youwe Stadium.

The club is named after the Dafonsoro mountain (also known as Cyclops Mountains) near Jayapura.

Players

References

External links
 Profile Persidafon Dafonsoro at Liga-Indonesia.com
 Persidafon Dafonsoro at National-Football-Teams.com

Persidafon
Football clubs in Indonesia
Football clubs in Papua (province)
Association football clubs established in 1970
1970 establishments in Indonesia